Carmina and Amen is a 2014 Spanish comedy film directed by Paco León, starring Carmina Barrios as the title character alongside María León, Paco Casaus, Yolanda Ramos, Teresa Casanova and Mari Paz Sayago. It is a sequel to the 2012 film Carmina or Blow Up.

Plot 
The plot takes place in Seville. Following the sudden death of her husband, Carmina decides not to report the death so she could clinch an extra pay.

Cast

Production 
The film is an Andy Joke and Telecinco Cinema production, with the participation of Mediaset España and Canal+. It was shot in Seville in 2013.

Release 
The film was presented at the 17th Málaga Film Festival on 22 March 2014. Distributed by A Contracorriente Films, it was theatrically released in Spain on 30 April 2014. It grossed around €2 million at the Spanish box office.

Reception 
Jonathan Holland of The Hollywood Reporter considered that, compared to the first installment, the film "still feels fresh, but it's also more polished, sharper, and funnier", featuring a thin plot, essentially a device "to allow the larger-than-life Carmina to be herself".

Mirito Torreiro of Fotogramas rated the film 4 out of 5 stars, praising the Paco León's leap forward as a filmmaker, noting that the film preserves a "sharp sociological look", and a "costumbrista and deeply Andalusian humor, but with universal repercussions and echoes", featuring an "extraordinarily effective" supporting cast, chief among them Yolanda Ramos.

Carlos Marañón of Cinemanía also gave 4 stars, assessing that the film picks up the autochthonous folk humor and takes it to a place somewhere close to post-humor, also pointing out at the "incommensurable" performance by Yolanda Ramos, determining the sequel to be "the perfect culmination".

Jordi Batlle Caminal of La Vanguardia wrote that the film is "a sequel that is on par, perhaps even a notch above, the original".

Accolades 

|-
| align = "center" rowspan = "2" | 2014 || rowspan = "2" | 17th Málaga Film Festival || Silver Biznaga for Best Screenplay || Paco León ||  || rowspan = "2" | 
|-
| Silver Biznaga for Best Supporting Actress || Yolanda Ramos || 
|-
| align = "center" rowspan = "11" | 2015 || rowspan = "7" | 2nd Feroz Awards || colspan = "2" | Best Comedy Film ||  || align = "center" rowspan = "7" | 
|-
| Best Director || Paco León || 
|-
| Best Actress || Carmina Barrios || 
|-
| rowspan = "2" | Best Supporting Actress || María León || 
|-
| Yolanda Ramos || 
|-
| Best Film Poster || || 
|-
| Best Trailer || || 
|-
| rowspan = "2" | 70th CEC Medals || Best Supporting Actress || María León ||  || rowspan = "2" | 
|-
| Best New Actress || Yolanda Ramos || 
|-
| 29th Goya Awards || Best New Actress || Yolanda Ramos ||  || 
|-
| 27th European Film Awards || colspan = "2" | Best Comedy ||  || 
|}

See also 
 List of Spanish films of 2014

References 

2014 comedy films
Spanish comedy films
Films shot in the province of Seville
2010s Spanish-language films
Spanish sequel films
Films set in Seville
Telecinco Cinema films
2010s Spanish films